Félicité Fernig (1770–1841) was with her sister Théophile Fernig (1775–1819), known as one of the Sœurs Fernig (Fernig sisters); two sisters who enlisted in the French army dressed as men during the French revolutionary wars, and who were allowed to remain in service after their gender was discovered, becoming celebrities frequently mentioned in the contemporary French press.

They were born to Marie Adrienne Bassez and the cavalry sergeant François Louis Joseph Fernig, who educated them in the use of weapons, and when the Austrians invaded France in 1792, they enlisted in the defense dressed as men and were admired for their courage. When their sex were discovered, they were allowed to remain in service, which happened in at least some cases during this period. They served during the Battle of Valmy, Battle of Jemappes, Battle of Anderlecht, and the Battle of Neerwinden. They were appointed aide-de-camp officers under General Charles François Dumouriez, and after his treason in 1793 they were sentenced to exile despite their pleas that they had taken no part in his betrayal. Their exile was retracted in 1802 and they settled in Brussels, where Félicité married captain François Joseph Herman Van der Wallen.

References 
 
 

Female wartime cross-dressers
French military personnel of the Napoleonic Wars
French military personnel of the French Revolutionary Wars
Women in 18th-century warfare
Women in war in France
French female military personnel